Den Dreef, also known as King Power at Den Dreef for sponsorship reasons, is a football stadium situated on Kardinaal Mercierlaan in the Heverlee suburb of Leuven in Belgium. It is home to Jupiler Pro League football team Oud-Heverlee Leuven and hosts the home matches of the Belgium women's national football team and the Belgium national under-21 football team. The entrance for visiting spectators is on Tervuursevest.

Extensions

With the establishment of Oud-Heverlee Leuven in 2002, the stadium changed its name from Leuvens Sportcentrum to Den Dreef. At that point the stadium had a track and field layout, with the pitch surrounded by tartan track running lanes. There was one main stand with seats approximately two-thirds of the length of the pitch and a smaller stand with covered standing terracing on the opposite side. Both of these were covered, whereas in both curves the standing places were not covered. The initial layout was such that visiting teams used the north curve and received a part of the smaller stand.

A first extension came when the curves were demolished and new covered single tier stands were built on top of the track behind both goals, which allowed the supporters to sit much closer to the field. The one behind the goal to the west is normally reserved for visiting supporters.

In the summer of 2011 the lower tier of the main stand was extended to run the whole length of the pitch, increasing the capacity of the stadium to 8,519 in preparation for the larger attendances expected following Oud-Heverlee Leuven's promotion to the Belgian Pro League in season 2010-11. In the summer of 2012 the upper tier of the main stand was also extended, further increasing the stadium capacity to 9,493 and adding extra space to its corporate entertainment and conference facilities.

In December 2015 the stand opposite the main stand was demolished and replaced with a similar stand as the main stand. This new stand has been in use since the 2016-17 season and contains skyboxes, media facilities and the dressing rooms which were previously located in a separate building some 20 meters outside of the stadium. The capacity has increased further to 10,020. At this point the stadium no longer had places reserved for standing, but both smaller stands behind the goals are typically used by supporters that stand rather than sit.

OH Leuven has announced further plans to expand the stadium, stating that the expansion in 2016 was just phase one of a three phase expansion plan. Phase two will involve expanding the smaller stand behind the west side goal and connecting it to the main stand, increasing the capacity to 11,000. During the third phase the smaller stand on the east side will be expanded by adding again 1,000 places for standing and connecting the stand to the two stands along the long sides of the pitch. The total capacity will increase to somewhere between 12,000 and 13,000.

References

External links
 Stadion info and images. OHL.be club website. Retrieved 14 November 2015.

Football venues in Flanders
Sports venues in Flemish Brabant
Buildings and structures in Leuven
Oud-Heverlee Leuven